Dmitry Aleksandrovich Lukashenko (Dzmitry Alaksandravič Łukašenka; born 23 March 1980) is a Belarusian businessman and son of Alexander Lukashenko, the President of Belarus, who is frequently thought to be the last dictator in Europe.

Early life and education
Dmitry Lukashenko was born on 23 March 1980 to Galina Lukashenko and Alexander Lukashenko.

Dmitry Lukashenko graduated from the International Relations faculty of the Belarusian State University. He served in the Border Guard Service of Belarus.

Career
He is the head of the Presidential Sports Club.

Accusations, EU sanctions
In 2011, after the wave of repressions that followed the 2010 presidential election in Belarus, Lukashenko became subject to an EU travel ban and asset freeze as part of a sanctions list of 208 individuals responsible for political repressions, electoral fraud and propaganda. In the EU Council's decision, Lukashenko has been described as "Businessman, with active participation in financial operations involving the Lukashenka family.” The sanctions were lifted in 2016.

On 21 June 2021, Dmitry Lukashenko was again banned from entering the European Union. Switzerland joined the sanctions on 7 July.

On December 2, 2021, Dmitry Lukashenko and the Presidential Sports Club were added to the Specially Designated Nationals and Blocked Persons List by the United States Department of the Treasury as well as to the Canadian sanctions list.

See also
 List of people and organizations sanctioned in relation to human rights violations in Belarus

References

External links

Living people
1980 births
Belarusian diplomats
Belarusian businesspeople
Children of national leaders
Dmitry
Belarusian State University alumni
People from Mogilev
Belarusian individuals subject to the U.S. Department of the Treasury sanctions
Specially Designated Nationals and Blocked Persons List